Gowharabad may refer to:
 Gowharabad, Kermanshah